Allan Clark Towell (7 March 1925 – 6 March 1997) was a rugby union centre who played twice for  between 1948–51.  He played his club rugby for Leicester Tigers and Bedford Blues.

Towell made his Leicester Tigers debut on 6 September 1947 against Bedford at Welford Road, scoring a try in a 22-3 win.  Towell featured regularly for Leicester at fly-half and centre in the 1947–48 & 1948–49 seasons playing 60 of the club's 75 games.  Towell was named as Leicester's captain for the 1949–50 season where he experimented by playing himself at flanker.

He played one further match in 1951 against  at Twickenham.

References

1925 births
1997 deaths
Bedford Blues players
England international rugby union players
English rugby union players
Leicester Tigers players
Rugby union centres
Rugby union players from Middlesbrough